Ji-Young Oh (born 3 July 1988) is a South Korean professional golfer currently playing on the LPGA Tour.

Amateur career
Oh started playing golf at the age of 12 and was named to the Korean National Team in 2005 at the age of 16.

In 2006, she came to the United States and enrolled at the Leadbetter Academy. She played on the Future Collegians World Tour, a second tier amateur golf league, and won all six events she entered.

In the fall of 2006 she entered the LPGA Qualifying Tournament as an amateur and finished 9th, earning exempt status on the LPGA Tour for 2007. She immediately turning professional.

Professional career
In 2007, her best finish was sixth at the Safeway Classic, where she carded a career-low 66 in the opening round.

In 2008, she earned her first win at the State Farm Classic beating top rookie Yani Tseng in a playoff.

In 2009, she gained her second win at the Sybase Classic.

Professional wins (2)

LPGA Tour (2) 

LPGA Tour playoff record (1–0)

Results in LPGA majors
Results not in chronological order before 2015.

^ The Evian Championship was added as a major in 2013.

CUT = missed the half-way cut
"T" = tied

LPGA Tour career summary

Official as of the 2016 season

References

External links

Profile on SeoulSisters.com

South Korean female golfers
LPGA Tour golfers
Golfers from Seoul
1988 births
Living people